Army Aviation Command might refer to: 

 Army Aviation Command (Argentina)
 Army Aviation Command (Australia)
 Brazilian Army Aviation Command
 Indonesian Army Aviation Command
 Turkish Army Aviation Command
 United States Army
 Army Reserve Aviation Command
 United States Army Aviation and Missile Command
 U.S. Army Special Operations Aviation Command